Coatomer subunit gamma-2 is a protein that in humans is encoded by the COPG2 gene.

Interactions 

COPG2 has been shown to interact with Dopamine receptor D1 and COPB1.

References

External links

Further reading